Brindavanam is a 2010 Indian Telugu-language romantic comedy drama film written and directed by Vamshi Paidipally. The film stars N. T. Rama Rao Jr., Kajal Aggarwal, and Samantha while Prakash Raj and Srihari play pivotal roles. The film is produced by Dil Raju's Sri Venkateswara Creations. S. Thaman composed the music.

The film released on 14 October 2010 and was a critical and commercial success. The film is remade as Love Master in Odia, Brindavana in Kannada, Khoka 420 in Indian Bengali, Buk Fatey To Mukh Foteyna in Bangladeshi Bengali, Vrundavan in Marathi, Hum Hai Jodi No 1 in Bhojpuri.

Plot

Krishna alias Krish (N. T. Rama Rao Jr.) is the son of Surendra (Mukesh Rishi), a multimillionaire in Hyderabad. He is in a relationship with Indu (Samantha Ruth Prabhu), who has a friend Bhoomi (Kajal Aggarwal). Bhoomi's father, Bhanu Prasad (Prakash Raj), wants to get her married to her cousin suitor (Ajay), who is a rowdy, which Bhoomi does not like. Naturally, her grandfather Durga Prasad (Kota Srinivasa Rao) tells to the family that she has already fallen in love with a guy in the city to halt the marriage, but Bhaanu Prasad asks Bhoomi to bring her boyfriend home with her. Indu sends Krish as Bhoomi's lover just to let her escape the wedding situation.

Upon arriving in Bhoomi's village, Krish learns through Bhoomi about everyone in her family. He thinks that the people in her home are living as individuals and not as an actual family with bonds and emotions. Krish changes the attitudes of Bhoomi's uncles (Raghu Babu, Ahuti Prasad) who are lazy at home doing nothing, and successfully wins the heart of the family members. Durga Prasad then reveals to Krish that Bhanu Prasad and his stepbrother Sivudu (Srihari) have been rivals for 25 years because Durga Prasad married a second time when his first wife died, against Bhaanu Prasad's wishes, and Sivudu is born to the new couple. This is the reason for Bhanu Prasad's hatred towards Sivudu. Upon splitting their inherited wealth in half, the two brothers have their father, Durga Prasad live in each of their households for six-month periods. Krish decides to reunite the two brothers and succeeds, much to the happiness of the two families.

Bhanu Prasad, impressed by Krish, accepts Bhoomi's love and decides to get them married. This worries Krish and Bhoomi as the initial plan was to only cancel the marriage of Bhoomi and her suitor, not to have Bhaanu Prasad accept their "relationship". Bhoomi's suitor, out of lust for her and anger on the wedding's cancellation, vows to get her by any means. The story takes a turn when Indu, who is none other than Sivudu's wife's sister's a.k.a. adopted daughter, arrives in the scene. Sivudu decides to get Indu married to her lover alongside Bhoomi's marriage, not aware of Krish's real identity. Indu then lies to Sivudu that her lover has ditched her in order to save Krish's act. Sivudu orders his men to find Indu's lover's (Krish's) parents and bring them to him. Bhanu Prasad also asks Krish to bring his parents to settle the marriage alliance. Indu sets up a fake father (Brahmanandam) and mother (Hema) for Krish before his parents arrive at the place, but when Krish's parents arrive at the scene, they are shocked to see Krish there (who they thought was on a world tour). Krish explains the whole situation to them and has them play along.

Bhanu Prasad engages Bhoomi with Krish and tells them to decide when they want to marry. Just as when Krish thinks that all is settled and prepares to walk out of Bhoomi's life, Bhoomi reveals that she has fallen in love with Krish, which Indu overhears. Fate takes another turn when Bhoomi's suitor finds out about the real identities and reveals this to Sivudu, who confronts Indu. Bhanu Prasad, too learns of the act, and along with Sivudu, beats up Krish before Durga Prasad intervenes. Durga Prasad reveals to them that the act was created by him in order to save Bhoomi from her ruthless suitor. He also reveals that Krish did not cheat Indu (which is what Sivudu thinks) and that it was Indu who sent Krish. He reveals to Bhaanu Prasad that Bhoomi is also in love with Krish.

Just as things cool down, Bhoomi's suitor takes Bhoomi away by force, only to be chased by Krish. Krish finally beats up Bhoomi's suitor into submission and leaves with Bhoomi, but another problem arises when Krish has to decide between Indu, whom he loves, and Bhoomi, who loves him. Suddenly Lord Krishna (portrayed holographically by N. T. Rama Rao) appears in front of him to tell Krish that it is part of his life, but when Krish asks for a solution, Lord Krishna disappears, leaving Krish's fate to the audience.

Cast

 N. T. Rama Rao Jr. as Krishna alias Krish
 Kajal Aggarwal as Bhoomi
 Samantha Ruth Prabhu as Indu
 Prakash Raj as Bhanu Prasad, Bhoomi's father
 Srihari as Shiva Prasad alias Sivudu, Bhanu Prasad's step-brother, Indu's uncle
 Kota Srinivasa Rao as Durga Prasad, Bhoomi's grandfather
 Mukesh Rishi as Surendra, Krish's father
 Pragathi as Krish's mother
 Ajay as  Bhoomi's cousin
 Tanikella Bharani as Ajay's father
 Brahmanandam as "Bommarillu" father
 Hema as "Bommarillu" father's wife
 Venu Madhav as Chitti
 Brahmaji as Bhoomi's uncle
 Ahuti Prasad as Bhoomi's uncle
 Raghu Babu as Bhoomi's uncle
 Shanoor Sana as Bhoomi's aunt
 Surekha Vani as Bhoomi's aunt
 Sithara as Sivudu's wife
 Vijay Sai as Krish's friend
 Fish Venkat as Sivudu's henchmen 
 Prabhas Sreenu as Goon
 Supreeth as Goon
 Raghu Karumanchi as Goon
 Subbaraju
 Sunil
 N. T. Rama Rao as Lord Krishna (extended cameo, computerized)

Production

Development

In mid-July 2009, it was informed that Dil Raju would produce a film with N. T. Rama Rao Jr. titled Brindavanam with the caption Govindudu Andari Vadele which would be directed by Vamsi Paidipally who worked with Dil Raju previously in 2007 for the Average grosser Munna which starred Prabhas and Ileana. It was also said that the film would start its shoot in September 2009. The film was launched at Annapurna Studios in Hyderabad on 15 August 2009. On that day, it was declared that S. Thaman composed the music, Chota K. Naidu handled the Cinematography, Koratala Siva penned the dialogues while duo Ram-Lakshman composed the fights for the film. A Traditional and beautiful Villa set was constructed by Art director Anand Sai near Bachupally in 3 out of 4 acres land with the rest 1 acre utilized for a beautiful garden arrangement with refreshing environment which was dismantled on the film's completion.

A. S. Prakash and Anand Sai were the art directors of the film, while Ram and Lakshman composed the fight sequences of the film.

Casting
Initially, it was said that Dil Raju opted to select a new heroine opposite N. T. Rama Rao Jr. in this film. But Dil Raju later planned to select Trisha Krishnan as the heroine opposite N. T. Rama Rao Jr. However Kajal Aggarwal replaced Trisha as the heroine as she latter opted out of the project citing lack of Dates. By late November 2009, it was informed that one of the heroines was yet to be confirmed while Kota Srinivasa Rao, Prakash Raj and Srihari would appear in crucial roles. During an interaction with the media, Kajal Aggarwal revealed about her character in the film in mid January 2010. She spoke "My character in the film is more like myself. It has been great working with NTR and the director Vamsi Paidipalli. I play Bhoomi in the film, who is very reserved and quite an introvert. I am enjoying every moment working for the film". Even before the release of her debut film Ye Maaya Chesave on 19 February, Samantha Ruth Prabhu was selected as the second heroine in mid-February 2010.

Filming
Though it was planned that the film would start its shooting from 27 November 2009, the filming ultimately started from 1 December 2009 as N. T. Rama Rao Jr.'s preceding project Adhurs was in its final stage of production. The shooting continued in Pollachi at Tamil Nadu and there the first schedule of the shoot was completed. The makers planned the second schedule from 21 December to 6 January in Hyderabad. During the shoot of the second schedule, when the filming was continuing inside the Government Junior College on the Qurshid Jha Devidi premises at Hussainialam in the old city area of Hyderabad, a group of Telangana Rashtra Samithi activists assembled at the entrance. The agitators urged the film unit to stop the shooting, and when the director came out to pacify them, the protesters urged him to raise the Jai Telangana slogan and left as the latter obliged. In the end of January 2010, a chase sequence was shot near Shabdalaya Studios at Banjara Hills in Hyderabad under the supervision of Peter Hynes. In early February 2010, it was reported that the shooting continued in Pollachi again from 19 February 2010. After returning from Pollachi, the shooting continued in a specially constructed set at Miyapur in Hyderabad in the end of February 2010. Then it was reported that the shooting would continue at Badami in Karnataka and parts of Kerala after completion of the scheduled shoot in the House.

After a brief gap, the shooting continued at Vikarabad forest area in the end of June 2010, where a fight sequence was shot under the supervision of prominent fight choreographers Ram-Lakshman. However, the shooting was postponed for a week due to the sudden death of Kota Srinivasa Rao's son Kota Prasad. After canning a couple of fights and songs, the filming was said to continue in the beautiful locales of Greece with one of the two songs left to be picturised to be shot. In early August 2010, N. T. Rama Rao Jr. joined the sets of the film at the Villa set constructed at Bachupally. There the climax sequence was shot from 12 August 2010 which was followed by a song shoot on the leads at Annapurna Studios.

But N. T. Rama Rao Jr. was injured on the sets while performing a stunt sequence with ropes near Kokapet Mines. He was immediately rushed to KIMS hospital in Begumpet and got six stitches on his forehead. He was discharged by afternoon but was advised a 3-day rest by the doctors thus delaying the shoot. Later a part of the climax sequence and some crucial sequences were shot in Kerala at Chalakudy near Cochin including Athirapally waterfalls. Later the filming continued in Switzerland for 10 days where the song Nijamena was shot on N. T. Rama Rao Jr. and Kajal Aggarwal. After some patch work, the entire shooting ended on 15 September 2010.

Soundtrack

The soundtrack was composed by S. S. Thaman marking his first collaboration with both Vamsi Paidipally and N. T. Rama Rao Jr. respectively. The music was released on the night of 12 September 2010 through Aditya Music label at Shilpakala Vedika in Hyderabad and Venu Madhav and Udaya Bhanu hosted the function. Telugu film personalities including K Raghavendra Rao, S S Rajamouli, Siddharth, M. M. Keeravani, Prabhas, Samantha, Kajal Aggarwal, Koti, Boyapati Srinu, Brahmaji, K S Rama Rao, Chota K Naidu, Meher Ramesh, Sri Hari, Ashwini Dutt, Brahmanandam and Vijayan attended the audio release function. The Album received positive response from critics.

Release
In mid March 2010, when the filming was nearly 60% complete, Dil Raju announced that the film is being planned for a Mid July release. However, later in the end of August 2010, it was announced that the film would release on 1 October 2010 worldwide. But in the end of September 2010, the release date was shifted to 8 October 2010. The release of Mahesh Babu's Khaleja made matters worse and the film's release date was further shifted to 14 October 2010. Though it was rumored that the film's release was preponed to 9 October 2010 due to N. T. Rama Rao Jr.'s fans' pressure, Dil Raju confirmed that the film would release on 14 October 2010 in order to ensure a gap of a week from the release of Khaleja. On 8 October 2010 the film was awarded an U/A certificate from Central Board of Film Certification.

Distribution
The film was distributed by Sri Venkateswara Creations all over Andhra Pradesh. In early April 2010, the film's USA screening rights were sold to BlueSky Cinemas, Inc. along with Rama Rama Krishna Krishna which was also produced by Dil Raju. In mid April 2010, EuroAndhra released a press note confirming that they acquired the screening rights of the film along with Rama Rama Krishna Krishna and Siddharth starrer Baava in UK/EU and they thanked BlueSky Cinemas, Inc. for giving them the opportunity.

Reception
The film generally received positive reviews from critics. NDTV gave a review stating, "Vamsi, now proves that he, too, can top the Box Office with his subject and narration of a story. Koratala Siva's dialogues and Chota K Naidu's camera have helped him to realise his dream of putting together a good entertainer. NTR's performance is unquestionably the highlight of the film. " Idlebrain.com gave a review stating "First half of the movie is adequate. The major part of the second half is entertaining. The climax of the movie is debatable. The plus points are NTR and entertainment in the second half. On the flip side, the story of the movie gives us a deja vu feeling in many aspects and the emotional part should have been natural. Brindavanam is a decent and clean movie with enough ingredients to make it work at the box office. It is up to NTR to get a range for the movie" and rated the film 3.25/5. IndiaGlitz gave a review stating "Vamsi scripted a perfect screenplay for the film and it was so tight that the audiences could not move out of their seats and make them stick even in song sequences. Each and every scene in the movie was narrated with precision and the director should be commended for running the movie with perfection. You can watch the film with the whole family because of entertainment values. Definitely, the film will give you a relief after a stressful day." Oneindia Entertainment gave a review stating, "Though the story has the shades of old films, Vamsi has scripted a tight screenplay and he has narrated every scene with precision. You can watch the film with a family because of the entertainment values. Dil Raju is once again back on track. Vamsi Paidipalli has brought a smile on his face with his wholesome entertainer."

Box office
Brindavanam opened to positive reports and became the biggest hit in Jr. NTR's career. The film collected the highest opening numbers in Jr NTR's career and second best opening week of all time behind SS Rajamouli's Magadheera. Brindavanam ran for 50 days in 158 centers and 100 days in 11 direct centers. Brindavanam became the fifth biggest grosser of Telugu cinema by the end of its theatrical run and the fifth Telugu cinema to cross 30 crore share mark.

Remakes
It was first remade in Odia as Love Master starring Babushaan & Riya Dey. It was remade in Kannada as Brindavana starring Darshan, Karthika Nair and Milana Nagaraj. It was remade in Bengali as Khoka 420 starring Dev, Nusrat Jahan and Subhashree Ganguly. It was also remade in Bangladeshi as Buk Fatey To Mukh Foteyna starring Shakib Khan and Apu Biswas. It was remade in Marathi as Vrundavan starring Raqesh Vashisth, Pooja Sawant and Vaidehi Parashurami. It was remade in Bhojpuri as Hum Hai Jodi No 1 starring Rani Chatterjee, Ravi Kishan, Poonam Dubey and Aanara Gupta in 2016.

References

External links
 

2010 films
Films shot in Tamil Nadu
Telugu films remade in other languages
Films scored by Thaman S
Films directed by Vamsi Paidipally
2010s Telugu-language films
2010 action comedy films
2010 romantic comedy films
Indian action comedy films
Indian romantic action films
Indian romantic comedy films
Films shot in Chalakudy
Films shot in Kochi
Films directed by Vamshi Paidipally
Sri Venkateswara Creations films
Films shot in Thrissur